The 1978 Tennessee Volunteers football team (variously "Tennessee", "UT" or the "Vols") represented the University of Tennessee in the 1978 NCAA Division I-A football season. Playing as a member of the Southeastern Conference (SEC), the team was led by head coach Johnny Majors, in his second year, and played their home games at Neyland Stadium in Knoxville, Tennessee. They finished the season with a record of five wins, five losses and one tie (5–5–1 overall, 3–3 in the SEC).

Schedule

Team players drafted into the NFL

Reference:

References

Tennessee
Tennessee Volunteers football seasons
Tennessee Volunteers football